A metered-dose transdermal spray (MDTS) delivers a drug to the surface of the skin and is absorbed into the circulation on a sustained basis. It works in a similar manner to a transdermal patch or topical gel. The drug is delivered by a device placed gently against the skin and triggered, causing it to release a light spray containing a proprietary formulation of the drug that quickly dries on the skin to form an invisible drug depot. As it would be from a patch, the drug is then absorbed steadily for a predetermined amount of time.

References

Drug delivery devices
Dosage forms